Pfaff's was a drinking establishment in Manhattan, New York City, known for its literary and artistic clientele.

Description
Opened in 1855 by Charles Ignatious Pfaff, the original Pfaff’s was modeled after the German Rathskellers that were popular in Europe at the time. Charles Pfaff's beer cellar was located on Broadway near Bleecker Street (before 1862, Pfaff's address was given as 647 Broadway; after 1865, its location was advertised as 653 Broadway) in Greenwich Village, New York City. To enter the beer cellar—which was actually a vaulted ceiling bar and restaurant—its patrons had to go down a set of stairs.

From the mid-1850s to the late 1860s, Pfaff’s was the center of New York’s revolutionary culture. As writer Allan Gurganus has said, "Pfaff’s was the Andy Warhol factory, the Studio 54, the Algonquin Round Table all rolled into one."

Habitués included journalist and social critic Henry Clapp, Jr., Walt Whitman, author and actress Ada Clare, poet and actress Adah Isaacs Menken, playwright John Brougham, artist Elihu Vedder, pianist and composer Louis Moreau Gottschalk (who also had an affair with Ada Clare), actor Edwin Booth, author Fitz Hugh Ludlow, and humorist Artemus Ward. Whitman called Charlie Pfaff "a generous German restaurateur, silent, stout, jolly," as well as "the best selector of champagne in America." Whitman also wrote an unfinished poem about Pfaff’s called "The Two Vaults," which included the lines:

Writer Fitz James O'Brien also wrote an ode to Pfaff's and to the clientele; an annotated copy of these lyrics titled At Pfaff's was pasted by Thomas Butler Gunn into his 1860 diary and can be seen at The Vault at Pfaff's website.

Clapp, considered by many the "King of Bohemia", founded The Saturday Press as New York's answer to the Atlantic Monthly. Started as a literary magazine, The Saturday Press eventually became a countercultural zine "with a mix of poetry, stories, radical politics, and an enthusiastic spirit of personal freedom and sexual openness. Before it folded in 1868, it published numerous poems by Whitman and a short story by Mark Twain. The Saturday Press championed Leaves of Grass, a move that many view as a significant factor in the success of the 1860 edition."

In 1870, Charles Pfaff moved his business up to midtown. Whitman wrote about Pfaff’s in Specimen Days after a visit to the restaurateur's newer location many years later:

Current status
The original location at 653 Broadway eventually became an envelope factory. In 1975, it became a disco called Infinity, which was destroyed by fire in 1979. Today, the location is home to a few shops.

In the spring of 2011, a restaurant and bar using the name The Vault at Pfaff's opened at 643 Broadway, near the original Pfaff's location. It too was accessed by descending a set of stairs, which led into a refurbished cellar. The Vault at Pfaff's has since closed.

References

Further reading

Martin, Justin. Rebel Souls: Walt Whitman and America’s First Bohemians. New York: Da Capo Press, 2014. 

Andie Tucher, "Reporting for Duty: The Bohemian Brigade, the Civil War, and the Social Construction of the Reporter," Book History 9 (2006): 131-57.

Writers from New York (state)
1855 establishments in New York (state)
Drinking establishments in Greenwich Village
Algonquin Round Table